may mean:
 Monastery of Nuestra Señora de Valvanera, a Catholic monastery in Anguiano, La Rioja, Spain
 Valvanera Cathedral, Mexico City, a Maronite cathedral in Mexico City
 SS Valbanera, a Spanish ship sunk in 1919